Choreutis japonica is a moth in the family Choreutidae. It was described by Zeller in 1877. It is found in Japan.

The larvae feed on Ficus erecta.

References

Natural History Museum Lepidoptera generic names catalog

Choreutis
Moths described in 1877